Victor Amaya and Hank Pfister were the defending champions.

Tim Gullikson and Tom Gullikson won the title, defeating John McEnroe and Peter Rennert 6–4, 3–6, 7–6(7–3) in the final.

Seeds

Draw

Draw

External links
Draw

Tokyo Indoor
1982 Grand Prix (tennis)